Petr Krol (born 14 July 1965) is a Czech weightlifter. He competed in the men's heavyweight I event at the 1992 Summer Olympics.

References

1965 births
Living people
Czech male weightlifters
Olympic weightlifters of Czechoslovakia
Weightlifters at the 1992 Summer Olympics
Sportspeople from Ostrava